The axes of a two-dimensional Cartesian system divide the plane into four infinite regions, called quadrants, each bounded by two half-axes.

These are often numbered from 1st to 4th and denoted by Roman numerals: I (where the signs of the (x; y) coordinates are I (+; +), II (−; +), III (−; −), and IV (+; −). When the axes are drawn according to the mathematical custom, the numbering goes counter-clockwise starting from the upper right ("northeast") quadrant.

Mnemonic

In the above graphic, the words in quotation marks are a mnemonic for remembering which three trigonometric functions (sine, cosine and tangent) are positive in each quadrant. The expression reads "All Science Teachers Crazy" and proceeding counterclockwise from the upper right quadrant, we see that "All" functions are positive in quadrant I, "Science" (for sine) is positive in quadrant II,  "Teachers" (for tangent) is positive in quadrant III, and "Crazy" (for cosine) is positive in quadrant IV. There are several variants of this mnemonic.

See also
 Orthant
 Octant (solid geometry)

External links 

 
 

Euclidean plane geometry